This is a comprehensive list of the most noteworthy and tallest buildings in Albania.

Skyscrapers

Highrises

Towers

Clock towers
In Albania, clock towers were commonly found in the most lively and visible spaces of cities, in bazaars, near the main mosques and at times, in less usual spaces like inside castles, etc. They were seen as reference points, in contrast to the silhouette of the neighborhood and the city in general. The construction of these important urban objects was marked by an increased demand from the civil society of that time.

Tower houses
The term "kulla" or "kullë e veçuar" (detached tower) refers to tall fortified buildings that performed various defensive functions.
Detached towers served as observation points for road or border control, for signal exchange; as fortified dwellings, as primary towers in fortified cities and castles; for the protection of monasteries and finally as temporary dwellings of landowners during the summer months or for observation during the collection of agricultural products.

The largest concentration of kullas can be found in the historic region of Mirditë, known as the epicenter of catholicism in the country. Mirdita was an important political center and its bajraks held considerable influence in the political affairs of pre-independent Albania.

Industrial towers

See also
 List of tallest structures in Albania
 List of tallest buildings in Kosovo
 List of tallest buildings in the Balkans

References

Tallest
Albania